Events in the year 1993 in Mexico.

Incumbents

Federal government
 President: Carlos Salinas de Gortari
 Interior Secretary (SEGOB): Fernando Gutiérrez Barrios/Patrocinio González Garrido
 Secretary of Foreign Affairs (SRE): Fernando Solana Morales/Manuel Camacho Solís
 Communications Secretary (SCT): Emilio Gamboa Patrón
 Secretary of Defense (SEDENA): Antonio Riviello Bazán
 Secretary of Navy: Luis Carlos Ruano Angulo
 Secretary of Labor and Social Welfare: Arsenio Farell Cubillas
 Secretary of Welfare: Luis Donaldo Colosio/Carlos Rojas Gutiérrez
 Secretary of Public Education: Ernesto Zedillo Ponce de León/Fernando Solana Morales
 Tourism Secretary (SECTUR): Silvia Hernández Enríquez
 Secretary of the Environment (SEMARNAT): Guillermo Jiménez Morales
 Secretary of Health (SALUD): Jesús Kumate Rodríguez

Supreme Court

 President of the Supreme Court: Ulises Schmill Ordóñez

Governors

 Aguascalientes: Otto Granados Roldán, (Institutional Revolutionary Party, PRI)
 Baja California: Ernesto Ruffo Appel, (National Action Party PAN)
 Baja California Sur: Víctor Manuel Liceaga Ruibal/Guillermo Mercado Romero (PRI)
 Campeche: Jorge Salomón Azar García
 Chiapas: Patrocinio González Garrido/Elmar Setzer Marseille
 Chihuahua: Francisco Barrio (PAN)
 Coahuila: Eliseo Mendoza Berrueto/Rogelio Montemayor Seguy (PRI)
 Colima: Carlos de la Madrid Virgen
 Durango: Maximiliano Silerio Esparza
 Guanajuato: Carlos Medina Plascencia
 Guerrero: José Francisco Ruiz Massieu/Rubén Figueroa Alcocer (PRI)
 Hidalgo: Adolfo Lugo Verduzco/Jesús Murillo Karam
 Jalisco: Carlos Rivera Aceves
 State of Mexico: Ignacio Pichardo Pagaza/Emilio Chuayffet (PRI)
 Michoacán: Ausencio Chávez Hernández
 Morelos
Antonio Riva Palacio (PRI), until May 17.
Jorge Carrillo Olea (PRI), starting May 18. 
 Nayarit: Celso Humberto Delgado Ramírez
 Nuevo León: Sócrates Rizzo (PRI)
 Oaxaca: Diódoro Carrasco Altamirano (PRI)
 Puebla: Mariano Piña Olaya/Manuel Bartlett Díaz (PRI)
 Querétaro: Enrique Burgos García (PRI)
 Quintana Roo: Miguel Borge Martín/Mario Villanueva Madrid (PRI)
 San Luis Potosí: Horacio Sánchez Unzueta (PRI)
 Sinaloa: Renato Vega Alvarado (PRI)
 Sonora: Manlio Fabio Beltrones Rivera (PRI)
 Tabasco: Salvador Neme Castillo/Manuel Gurría Ordóñez (PRI)
 Tamaulipas: Américo Villarreal Guerra/Manuel Cavazos Lerma (PRI)	
 Tlaxcala: Samuel Quiróz de la Vega/José Antonio Álvarez Lima (PRD)
 Veracruz: Patricio Chirinos Calero (PRD)
 Yucatán: Dulce María Sauri Riancho/Ricardo Ávila Heredia (PRI)
 Zacatecas: Arturo Romo Gutiérrez (PRI)
Regent of Mexico City
Manuel Camacho Solís
Manuel Aguilera Gomez

Events

 The Foro Sol opened 
 Musical bands La Gusana Ciega and Hocico are founded.
 Arqueología Mexicana has its first issue published. 
 May 14: The Ecologist Green Party of Mexico is founded. 
 May 21: The Miss Universe 1993 contest was held at the Auditorio Nacional in Mexico City.
 May 24: Roman Catholic Cardinal Juan Jesús Posadas Ocampo and five other people are assassinated in a shootout at Miguel Hidalgo y Costilla Guadalajara International Airport.
 September 3: Sistema Nacional de Creadores de Arte founded per presidential decree.
 December 1: The Apostolic Nunciature to Mexico, Girolamo Prigione, has a secret meeting with drug lord Ramón Arellano Félix, who was implicated in the assassination of Cardinal Juan Jesús Posadas six months earlier.

Awards
Belisario Domínguez Medal of Honor – Andrés Henestrosa

Hurricanes

 June 18–20: Tropical Storm Beatriz (1993) 
 June 18–21: Tropical Storm Arlene (1993) 
 August 17–27: Hurricane Hilary (1993) 
 September 8–14: Hurricane Lidia (1993)
 September 14–26: Hurricane Gert

Sport

 1992–93 Mexican Primera División season 
 Olmecas de Tabasco win the Mexican League.
 1993 Caribbean Series played at Estadio Teodoro Mariscal in Mazatlán.
 1993 CONCACAF Gold Cup 
 1993 IAAF World Race Walking Cup
 Alto Rendimiento Tuzo is founded.

Births
April 2 – Jaime Romero Móran, artistic gymnast, (d. January 3, 2015). 
 September 18 – Mariana Avitia, archer
 October 23 – Daniela Álvarez, winner of Nuestra Belleza México 2013 beauty pageant in 2013
 December 11 – Yalitza Aparicio, actress and educator

Deaths
 May 24 – Juan Jesús Posadas Ocampo Cardinal of Roman Catholic Archdiocese of Guadalajara, 1987-1993 (b. November 11, 1906).

References